Corythucha distincta is a species of lace bug in the family Tingidae. It is found in North America.

Subspecies
These two subspecies belong to the species Corythucha distincta:
 Corythucha distincta distincta Osborn & Drake, 1916
 Corythucha distincta spinata Osborn & Drake, 1917

References

Further reading

 
 

Tingidae
Articles created by Qbugbot
Insects described in 1916